This page documents the costliest tornadoes during 2022. Damage totals for tornadoes in the United States are published by the National Oceanic and Atmospheric Administration (NOAA). Generally, two departments of NOAA can publish damage statistics for tornadoes: the National Centers for Environmental Information and the National Weather Service.

Yearly

All damage totals are in US dollars, unadjusted for inflation. Data from the National Oceanic and Atmospheric Administration's National Centers for Environmental Information (NOAA NCEI).

January

The National Centers for Environmental Information recorded that tornadoes during January 2022 caused $15,270,000 in damage.

February

The National Centers for Environmental Information recorded that tornadoes during February 2022 caused $50,000 in damage. Only one tornado during the month received a damage total from NOAA. However, an EF2 tornado struck Sawyerville, Alabama, killing one person and injuring eight others, so it has been marked with an incomplete damage total.

March

The National Centers for Environmental Information recorded that tornadoes during March 2022 caused $303,158,000 in damage.

April

The National Centers for Environmental Information recorded that tornadoes during April 2022 caused $52,880,000 in damage.

May

The National Centers for Environmental Information recorded that tornadoes during May 2022 caused $67,823,000 in damage.

June

The National Centers for Environmental Information recorded that tornadoes during June 2022 caused $26,804,000 in damage.

July

The National Centers for Environmental Information recorded that tornadoes during July 2022 caused $6,483,500 in damage.

August

The National Centers for Environmental Information recorded that tornadoes during August 2022 caused $4,235,000 in damage.

September

The National Centers for Environmental Information recorded that tornadoes during September 2022 caused $2,575,000 in damage.

October

The National Centers for Environmental Information recorded that tornadoes during October 2022 caused $1,257,000 in damage.

November

The National Centers for Environmental Information recorded that tornadoes during November 2022 caused $64,649,000 in damage.

December

The National Centers for Environmental Information recorded that tornadoes during October 2022 caused $600,000 in damage. Only two tornadoes during the month received damage totals from National Oceanic and Atmospheric Administration.

See also
 Weather of 2022
 Tornadoes of 2022

Notes

References

2022 meteorology
Tornadoes of 2022